The 2001 Vodacom Cup was the 4th edition of this annual domestic cup competition.

Competition
There were 15 teams participating in the 2001 Vodacom Cup. These teams were divided into two sections of equal strength; Section X with eight teams and Section Y with seven teams. Teams would play all the other teams in their section once over the course of the season, either at home or away.

Teams received four points for a win and two points for a draw. Bonus points were awarded to teams that score four or more tries in a game, as well as to teams losing a match by seven points or less. Teams were ranked by points, then points difference (points scored less points conceded).

The top four teams in each section qualified for the Vodacom Top Eight competition, while the bottom four teams in Section X and the bottom three teams in Section Y qualified for the Vodacom Shield competition. For both the Vodacom Top Eight and Vodacom Shield competitions, all points already scored against teams that progressed to the same competition were carried forward. Teams then played once against the teams that qualified from the other section, with the top four teams in each competition advancing to the quarter-finals.

In the quarter finals, the teams that finished first in each competition had home advantage against the teams that finished fourth and the teams that finished second in each competition had home advantage against the teams that finished third. The winners of these quarter finals then played each other in the semi-finals, with the higher placed team having home advantage. The two semi-final winners then met in the final for each competition.

Teams

Changes from 2000
The Northern and Southern Sections were scrapped and replaced with two sections of equal strength; Sections X and Y.

Team Listing
The following teams took part in the 2001 Vodacom Cup competition:

Pool Phases

Tables

Section X

Section Y

Results

Section X

Round one

Round two

Round three

Round four

Round Five

Round Six

Round Seven

Section Y

Round one

Round two

Round three

Round four

Round Five

Round Six

Round Seven

Vodacom Top Eight

Table

Results

Round one

Round two

Round three

Round four

Semi-finals

Final

Winners

Vodacom Shield
The  withdrew from the Vodacom Shield due to financial constraints.

Table

Results

Round one

Round two

Round three

Semi-finals

Final

Winners

References

Vodacom Cup
2001 in South African rugby union
2001 rugby union tournaments for clubs